Lars Olden Larsen (born 17 September 1998) is a Norwegian football midfielder who plays for Swedish club BK Häcken. He is also under contract with Russian club Nizhny Novgorod, but that contract is suspended.

Career

Club career
Growing up in Årvoll IL, he also made his senior debut on the fifth tier in 2014 before joining Vålerenga's youth setup. He did not secure a senior contract here, and instead joined second-tier KFUM. After impressing here and representing Norway as a youth and U21 international, he transferred to a first-tier team in 2020, Mjøndalen.

On 5 February 2022, Larsen signed a 3.5-year contract with Russian Premier League club Nizhny Novgorod. On 7 March 2022, FIFA announced that, due to the Russian invasion of Ukraine, foreign players in Russia would be able to unilaterally suspend their contracts with their clubs until 30 June 2022 and sign with a club outside of Russia until the same date. On 16 March 2022, Larsen suspended his contract with Nizhny Novgorod under this rule. On 19 March 2022, Larsen signed with BK Häcken in Sweden until 30 June 2022. The FIFA rule was extended until 30 June 2023, and on 28 June 2022 Larsen extended his contract with BK Häcken until that date.

Career statistics

Honours 
BK Häcken

 Allsvenskan: 2022

References

1998 births
Living people
Footballers from Oslo
Norwegian footballers
KFUM-Kameratene Oslo players
Mjøndalen IF players
FC Nizhny Novgorod (2015) players
BK Häcken players
Norwegian First Division players
Eliteserien players
Russian Premier League players
Association football midfielders
Norway youth international footballers
Norway under-21 international footballers
Norwegian expatriate footballers
Expatriate footballers in Russia
Norwegian expatriate sportspeople in Russia
Expatriate footballers in Sweden
Norwegian expatriate sportspeople in Sweden